Mittagong Lions Rugby League Football Club is an Australian rugby league football club based in Mittagong, New South Wales. Originally a rugby union club in the late 19th century, Mittagong was a founding member of the Berrima District Rugby League in 1914, just prior to the outbreak of the First World War.

Notable players 
Daniel Alvaro (2015- Parramatta Eels)
Jeremy Latimore (2021)

References

External links
Mittagong Lions RLFC Fox Sports pulse

Rugby league teams in Sydney
Rugby clubs established in 1914
1914 establishments in Australia
Mittagong, New South Wales